Honey bear may refer to:

Animals 
 American black bear, famous for honey being part of its diet
 Sun bear of Southeast Asia, which has light-colored upper-chest fur
 Sloth bear of Indian subcontinent, also with light-colored upper-chest fur
 Kinkajou, a rainforest mammal native to Central and South America

Nicknames of people 
 Nina Warren, known as "Honey Bear", daughter of Earl Warren and mother of Dr. William Brien
 Nickname of Nick Markakis (born 1983), right fielder for the Baltimore Orioles known for prowling right field and raking
 Nickname of Gene Sedric (1907–1963), American saxophonist
 Nickname of Hunter Travis Weigant as of 2022

Others 
 The Chicago Honey Bears, a cheerleading squad
 A commercially sold bear-shaped container of honey

See also 
 
 
 Curly Bear (Sesame Street), a character sometimes incorrectly referred to as Honey Bear